Mass point may refer to:
 Mass point geometry
 Point mass in physics
 The values of a probability mass function in probability and statistics